The SX2150 is a 5-ton class 6x6 special heavy duty truck. The vehicle will be phased out by the K variant or the SX2190 truck.

Development
The SX-250, the predecessor of the SX2150, was developed and built by Shaanxi Automobile Works as a cross country vehicle in the 1960s and loosely based on the Soviet Ural-375 and the cab/cargo-bed designs of the French Berliet GBU 15. It was renamed by the Shaanxi Automobile Corporation Limited and used by the People's Liberation Army of the People's Republic of China for various uses (crane truck, transport cab, transport, etc...)

Variants
Shaanxi SX2150K
Shaanxi SX2150KA
Shaanxi SX2150KB
Shaanxi SX2150KE
Shaanxi SX2150KS
Shaanxi SX4240E

References
 SX2150 Truck

External links
http://www.military-today.com/trucks/shaanxi_sx2150.htm

Military trucks of China
Military vehicles of the People's Republic of China
Military vehicles introduced in the 1960s